Baltimore Highlands is a census-designated place (CDP) in Baltimore County, Maryland, United States, directly south of the city of Baltimore. The population was 7,019 at the 2010 census. At the 2000 census and earlier, the area was delineated as part of the Lansdowne-Baltimore Highlands CDP.

History

In the area known as Baltimore Highlands is a legendary mansion called English Consul. The land and house were owned by William Dawson, the first English Consul to Maryland. One legend claims that Dawson had a brother who was transported from England to America in disgrace. Each year he was to receive a whip lashing as punishment for the crime he had committed. This took place on the English Consul estate. Another legend has it that the mansion was a stop on the Underground Railroad before the Civil War. In 1909 a developer purchased the estate. It was eventually divided into the areas known as Baltimore Highlands, Rosemont, Friendship Gardens and the small section still called English Consul.

In the 1980s Baltimore County Recreation and Parks opened a large parcel of land for public use. Southwest Area Park is located on the Patapsco River just below Baltimore Highlands.

Geography
Baltimore Highlands is located at  (39.2359, −76.6374).  It is bounded to the northeast by the border of Baltimore City, to the west by the Baltimore–Washington Parkway, separating the area from Lansdowne, and to the south and southeast by the Patapsco River, which forms the boundary with Anne Arundel County.

Transit
The community is served by Baltimore Light Rail, which stops at the Baltimore Highlands station.

Roads
Annapolis Road (Maryland Route 648) runs north–south through Baltimore Highlands. To the north it enters Baltimore City, where it crosses West Patapsco Avenue.  To the south, it crosses the Patapsco River into the Pumphrey section of Anne Arundel County and an intersection with Maryland Route 170.

Demographics

At the 2010 census there were 7,019 people, 2,525 households, and 1,751 families in the CDP. The racial makeup of the CDP was 63.8% White, 21.7% African American, 0.4% Native American, 2.8% Asian, 0.1% Pacific Islander, 7.3 some other race, and 3.9% from two or more races. Hispanic or Latino of any race were 14.4%.

Of the 2,525 households 32.1% had children under the age of 18 living with them, 39.0% were headed by married couples living together, 22.0% had a female householder with no husband present, and 30.7% were non-families. 22.1% of households were made up of individuals, and 6.3% were one person aged 65 or older. The average household size was 2.78, and the average family size was 3.20.

The age distribution was 25.3% under the age of 18, 12.5% from 18 to 24, 29.5% from 25 to 44, 23.8% from 45 to 64, and 8.7% 65 or older. The median age was 31.7 years. For every 100 females, there were 96.1 males. For every 100 females age 18 and over, there were 94.0 males.

References

Census-designated places in Baltimore County, Maryland
Census-designated places in Maryland
Populated places on the Underground Railroad